Mobilization in Ukraine is a general (previously partial) mobilization into the Armed Forces of Ukraine, which has been taking place in Ukraine since 2014.

Earlier in Ukraine, mobilization was not carried out, but conscription into the armed forces was carried out. The call existed until 2013. On 14 October  2013, Viktor Yanukovych signed Decree of the President of Ukraine No. 562/2013, according to which, from 1 January 2014, conscription into the armed forces was suspended and further recruitment was to be carried out exclusively on a contract basis. After the Euromaidan, voluntary recruitment into the Armed Forces was canceled, and later mobilization began in them. The Ministry of Defense stated that the annual mobilization will take place in several stages. In accordance with Decree No. 303 of 17 March  2014, partial mobilization of those liable for military service was started and continued for many years.

From February 2022, since Russian invasion of Ukraine, first of all, reserve servicemen with combat experience who served in the Armed Forces under a contract or took part in hostilities in the Luhansk region and Donbass will be mobilized first. Then, military personnel who served on conscription until 2014 will fall under mobilization. And then those who graduated from the military departments at universities and became a reserve officer, as well as other persons who do not have age and physical restrictions, will be mobilized. General mobilization was announced for a period of three months. The presidential decree was approved by the Rada on 3 March 2022, and in accordance with it, men aged 18 to 60 will be mobilized. Defense Minister Oleksii Reznikov said that the Ukrainian authorities plan to mobilize 1,000,000 people.

According to the law "On mobilization training and mobilization", general mobilization in Ukraine is carried out simultaneously throughout its territory and concerns the economy, state authorities, local self-government, the armed forces, and other formations, enterprises, institutions, and organizations.

History 
In accordance with Decree No. 303 of 17 March 2014, a partial mobilization of those liable for military service was started. On 1 May 2014, due to the aggravation of the situation in eastern Ukraine, conscription for military service, canceled during the reign of Yanukovych, was restored, that is, the transition to professional armed forces was canceled. On May 6, 2014, another partial mobilization was announced.

After the completion of the planned waves of mobilization in 2015, on 14 September, a month before the local elections in the country, President of Ukraine Petro Poroshenko announced that he had made a decision “under the conditions of the actual implementation of the ceasefire regime, to postpone mobilization, not to conduct and not to announce”. However, on 11 January 2016, Poroshenko stated that as soon as he received an appeal from the General Staff of the Armed Forces of Ukraine with a request to announce mobilization, he would immediately do it. On 15 January, the press service of the General Staff announced the mobilization planned for 2016.

As part of the six waves of mobilization that took place in 2014–2015, 210 thousand people were called up for military service, every sixth of them was registered as a volunteer. Three waves were held in 2014 and three more in 2015. Those called up as part of the fourth wave changed those called up in the first wave, the fifth changed the second, and the sixth - the third, the rotation period was about a year.

Starting from the third wave of mobilization, it includes those liable for military service who did not serve in the army. They undergo training for a month, after which they are sent to units, including to the zone of armed conflict.

For draft evasion for mobilization in accordance with Art. 336 of the Criminal Code of Ukraine provides for imprisonment for a term of two to five years. At the beginning of 2016, according to the register of court decisions, Ukrainian courts signed hundreds of convictions under this article.

In November 2015, the General Staff of the Armed Forces of Ukraine reported 2,673 military deaths, including 831 non-combat losses (careless handling of ammunition, suicide, road accidents, etc.), and more than 8,000 troops were injured.

2014 
On 1 March 2014, the National Security and Defense Council of Ukraine adopted, as well Acting President of Ukraine Oleksandr Turchynov put into effect the decision to put the army on full combat readiness and conduct training camps with the required number of conscripts.

On 17 March 2014, the Verkhovna Rada of Ukraine approved the draft law “On Approval of the Presidential Decree “On Partial Mobilization””, according to the explanatory note to which the need for this decision “is due to the aggravation of the socio-political situation on the Crimean Peninsula, undisguised aggression, the seizure by the Russian side of part of the territory Autonomous Republic of Crimea and the city of Sevastopol". The mobilization was planned within 45 days from the date of its entry into force in order to call up 20 thousand people and the same number to the newly created National Guard. By 24 March 2014, more than 10,000 citizens had already been mobilized into the Ukrainian army as part of partial mobilization.

On 6 May, the Verkhovna Rada of Ukraine extended the partial mobilization and demobilization of those called up, and the Acting President of Ukraine Oleksandr Turchynov signed a decree on partial mobilization in Ukraine, according to which additional forces throughout Ukraine were called up for 45 days.

Ukrainian society reacted to mobilizations with discontent and protests.

The third stage of partial mobilization started on 24 July, when a day earlier, President of Ukraine Petro Poroshenko signed the relevant law, approved by the parliament with the votes of 232 deputies (with the minimum required 226) - the Communist Party of Ukraine and the Party of Regions opposed the mobilization, and some of the deputies - for its implementation only after the declaration of martial law ; the borderline level of support for deputies caused criticism of the president.
Recruitment was planned in all regions of the country, except Crimea, for 45 days.
The third wave of mobilization ended on 9 September 2014.

Over 105,000 people were mobilized in 2014.

2015 
From January to April 2015, the fourth wave of mobilization was carried out, during which those called up in the first wave in 2014 were replaced. More than 40,000 troops were called up.

Carrying out the fifth and sixth stages of mobilization in the spring and summer of 2015 was complicated due to a large number of draft dodgers. To fulfill the plan, the military commissars handed out summonses at checkpoints at the entrance to settlements, in supermarkets, at checkpoints of manufacturing enterprises, on the streets, and in public transport. The plan of the sixth stage, which ended on August 17, was completed by only 60%, the shortfall was compensated by the admission of contract servicemen to the Armed Forces of Ukraine.

In total, about 104 thousand people were mobilized in 2015.

2016 
The main focus in 2016 was intended to be on contract service in the army. In connection with the increase in the minimum salary of a serviceman to 7,000 hryvnias (almost $300 at the exchange rate on February 1), a significantly increased number of people wishing to enter contract service is noted, for example, in January alone, the contract was signed by 400 people, by the beginning of March - more than 6 thousand, by the first half of April - more than 18 thousand, by the beginning of June - more than 32 thousand.

On 29 March, the decree of President Poroshenko on the transfer to the reserve of military personnel of the fourth wave of mobilization (about 45 thousand) came into force.

On 24 June, the decree of President Poroshenko on the transfer to the reserve of military personnel of the fifth wave of mobilization (about 17 thousand) came into force.

According to the Chief of the General Staff Viktor Muzhenko, the demobilization of the sixth wave of conscripts was planned to take place in August–September 2016.

2022 
President Volodymyr Zelenskyy signed decree 24.02.2022 № 64/2022 "On the imposition of martial law in Ukraine" on general mobilization in the country, which would commence on 25 February for a period of 90 days, calling up conscripts and reservists; all male Ukrainian citizens aged 18 to 60 were prohibited from travelling abroad, unless they could provide documents that they fulfilled specified conditions for exemption. Mobilization was carried out in all regions. The General Staff had to determine the "order and volume" of those mobilized, and the government had to provide the necessary funding. The heads of regional administrations had to “ensure the creation and operation of regional, district and city medical commissions,” the decree specified. Zelenskyy did not support a petition to allow men between the ages of 18 and 60 to leave the country abroad. In May 2022, the Verkhovna Rada extended martial law and mobilization in Ukraine for 90 days at once, until 23 August.

On 22 June 2022, a bill was submitted to the Verkhovna Rada prohibiting men of military age from traveling abroad during martial law. It is assumed that the circle of persons to whom an exception will be made will be determined by the law "On mobilization training and mobilization."

In July 2022, the Ministry of Defense of Ukraine decided that from October in the military commissariats, all women who received education in the fields of chemistry, biology, and telecommunications will have to enter the military register. The ministry explained that all women liable for military service will not be able to travel abroad during martial law.

In August 2022, the Verkhovna Rada extended martial law and general mobilization until 21 November 2022.

In September 2022, Deputy Minister of Defense of Ukraine Anna Malyar announced the forthcoming postponement of the deadlines for registering women for military registration for the next year, she clarified that: “The Ministry of Defense, within the framework of its powers, prepared a decree that once again postponed the deadlines for admitting women of certain professions / specialties to the military accounting for another year - until October 1, 2023.

On 17 November 2022, the Verkhovna Rada has adopted laws approving presidential decrees on the extension of martial law and general mobilization in Ukraine for 90 days, until February 19, 2023.

See also 
 Mobilization in Donetsk and Luhansk People's Republics
 2022 Russian mobilization

References 

Events affected by the 2022 Russian invasion of Ukraine
War in Donbas
Military of Ukraine
Russo-Ukrainian War